Michael Matus is a British actor.

Career
Matus performed in the 2002 production of Helen Edmundson's adaptation of The Mill on the Floss at the Kennedy Centre, for which he was nominated for a Helen Hayes Award.

Matus starred as Dionysos in The Frogs at the Jermyn Street Theatre in 2017.

References 

British male stage actors
Living people
Year of birth missing (living people)